John Scott Hindley, 1st Viscount Hyndley, GBE (24 October 1883 – 5 January 1963), known as Sir John Hindley, 1st Baronet, between 1927 and 1931 and as The Lord Hyndley between 1931 and 1948, was a British businessman. He was the first chairman of the National Coal Board at its creation on 1 January 1947.

Background
Hindley was the son of the Reverend William Talbot Hindley, vicar of Meads, Sussex, and Caroline, daughter of John Scott. He was educated at Weymouth College, Weymouth.

Business career
Hindley was a director of the Bank of England between 1931 and 1945 and he was managing director of Powell Duffryn Ltd, collieries, between 1931 and 1946. He became the first chairman of the National Coal Board at its creation on 1 January 1947, a post he held until 1951. Despite the Attlee government's pronouncement in 1947 that "Today the mines belong to the people", in reality the same people held influence over the operation of the mines. Hindley was chairman at the time of the explosion at Easington Colliery on 29 May 1951. Facing relatives of miners waiting at the colliery gates, he announced:
Though everything has been done and is still being done, there is now no hope of any of the men being alive. This is the worst pit disaster we have had in the History of the N.C.B.

Hindley was knighted in the 1921 Birthday Honours, created a baronet, of Meads in the County of Sussex, on 18 February 1927 and elevated to the peerage as Baron Hyndley, of Meads in the County of Sussex on 21 January 1931. He was further honoured when he was appointed a Knight Grand Cross of the Order of the British Empire (GBE) in the 1939 Birthday Honours, "for public services", and made Viscount Hyndley, of Meads in the County of Sussex on 2 February 1947. Lord Hyndley was also master of the Clothworkers' Company in 1953. The Viscount Hyndley Trophy was a trophy awarded to the British National Coal Board boxing champion.

Family
Lord Hyndley married Vera, daughter of James Westall, in 1901. They had two daughters. He died in January 1963, aged 79, when the baronetcy and two peerages became extinct.

Arms

References 

Going public – The Socialist Review

External links
 
 1948 Grant of Supporters

|-

1883 births
1963 deaths
British businesspeople in the coal industry
Knights Bachelor
Barons created by George V
Knights Grand Cross of the Order of the British Empire
Viscounts created by George VI